The Columbia Larrimer Building is a historic building in Downtown Columbus, Ohio. It was listed on the National Register of Historic Places in 1983. The building is significant for its storefront design and craftsmanship, along with the front interior installed by the Bott Brothers when they moved their bar there in 1905. The building was home to the Clock Restaurant in the mid-to-late 1900s, and currently Elevator Brewery & Draught Haus.

See also
 National Register of Historic Places listings in Columbus, Ohio

References

External links
 

Commercial buildings on the National Register of Historic Places in Ohio
Commercial buildings completed in 1895
National Register of Historic Places in Columbus, Ohio
Columbus Register properties
Buildings in downtown Columbus, Ohio
High Street (Columbus, Ohio)